Faik Kurdoğlu (1892 – 14 April 1981) was a Turkish writer, politician, and ideologue of Pan-Turkism.

References 

1892 births
1981 deaths
Pan-Turkists
People from Kayseri
Place of death missing
Republican People's Party (Turkey) politicians
Turkish male writers